The Beijing Zoo is a zoological park in Xizhimen, Xicheng District, Beijing, the capital of the China. Founded in 1906 during the late Qing dynasty, it is the oldest zoo in china and oldest public park in northern China.  The zoo is also a center of zoological research that studies and breeds rare animals from various continents.

It has one of the largest animal collections in the country. The zoo and its aquarium have over 450 species of land animals and over 500 species of marine animals; in all, it is home to 14,500 animals.

More than five million people visit the zoo each year.  Like many of Beijing's parks, the zoo's grounds resemble classical Chinese gardens, with flower beds amidst natural scenery, including dense groves of trees, stretches of meadows, small streams and rivers, lotus pools, and hills dotted with pavilions and historical buildings.

The Beijing Zoo is well known for its collection of rare animals endemic to China including the giant pandas, which are zoo's most popular animals, the red panda (Ailurus fulgens), native to the eastern Himalayas and southwestern China, the golden snub-nosed monkey, South China tiger, white-lipped deer, Pere David's deer, crested ibis, Chinese alligator, and Chinese giant salamander.  Other endangered or threatened species housed there include a Siberian tiger, yak, Przewalski's horse, snow leopard, Tibetan gazelle, and kiang.  The zoo also has a broad collection of megafauna such as addax, Asian black bears, Asian and African elephants, bats, beluga whales, chimpanzees, clouded leopards, flamingos, gorillas, hippopotamuses, jaguars, kangaroos, lemurs, lions, muntjac, otters, penguins, polar bears, rhinoceroses, sea turtles, tapirs, giraffes and zebras, as well as 13 of the world's 15 species of cranes.

History

Imperial Era
The zoo grounds originally housed an imperial manor during the Ming dynasty, that became part of the estate of the general Fuk'anggan during the Qing dynasty. In 1906, the Imperial Ministry for Agricultural, Industry and Commerce established an experimental farm outside of Xizhimen on land that encompassed two gardens, the Leshan and Ji, and two temples, the Guangshan and Huining. The experimental farm had five main experimental areas for grain, sericulture, vegetables, fruits and flowers. The menagerie was the earliest public zoo in China and the oldest public park in northern China.

Most of the animals were purchased by the Viceroy of Liangjiang, Duanfang, from Germany. The animal collection attracted great interest when the farm opened to visitors on June 16, 1908.  Admission cost eight copper coins with children at half price. The  Empress Dowager Cixi and the Guangxu Emperor each visited the zoo twice. The farm was known as the Wanshouyuan or the "Garden of Ten Thousand Beasts."  Among the historical buildings at the zoo is Changguanlou, a Baroque-style country-palace of Empress Dowager Cixi, designed by a French architect and built in 1908. It remains one of the best preserved Western-style palaces in China.

Republican Era
After the Qing dynasty was overthrown in 1911, the zoo became a national botanical garden during the Republican period. In the 1930s, with French aid, Lamarck Hall, named after the botanist Jean-Baptiste Lamarck, was built at the experimental farm and housed plant research. During the Second Sino-Japanese War, the Japanese occupiers built the monkey mountain in 1942, but used the experimental farm as a storage depot.  In 1943, the Imperial Japanese Army poisoned the zoo's six lions and two leopards, purportedly to remove potential interference with air defenses.  Many other animals, including the zoo's lone Asian elephant, died of starvation.  By the end of the war, only ten monkeys, rabbits, geese, two pigeons, flamingo, emu, peacock, eagle, and three parrots remained.

Early People's Republic
When Beijing became the capital of the People's Republic of China in 1949, only 13 monkeys, three parrots and an emu blind in one eye remained at the zoo.  The city government renamed the zoo the  Beijing Agricultural Experimentation Center the Western Suburban Park (西郊公园) and began gradually rebuilding the zoo.  In 1952, national leaders Mao Zedong, Zhu De, and Ren Bishi donated their war horses to the park.

The zoo sent staff to study zoo management in the Soviet Union and Poland, and began to trade animals with Eastern Bloc countries, Burma, India, Indonesia, and Japan to expand its collection. Zoo staff used some 30 species from the zoo including South China Tiger, François' langur, Chinese alligator, python and black bear in such trades. The Moscow Zoo and Leipzig Zoo donated 14 species including African lion, polar bear, brown bear, emu and Himalayan vulture.  The park was renamed the Beijing Zoo in 1955. Guo Moruo, the renowned writer and president of the Chinese Academy of Social Sciences wrote the calligraphy for the zoo's entrance sign.  Leading Chinese universities also established a research presence in the zoo to study animal behavior and to breed endangered species.  Giant panda was displayed at the zoo for the first time in 1955 and successfully bred by zoo staff in 1963.

New enclosures opened in the 1950s, the Lion-Tiger Mountain, Elephant House, Primate House, and Reptile House, which had specimens of over 100 species including crocodiles and pythons.  In 1958, the city government approved the expansion of the zoo to 21 hectares on the north bank of the Nanchang River.   In 1965, when the construction of the Capital Indoor Stadium took away 4 hectares of the zoo's land to the west, the city granted the zoo 2.3 hectares near the Ming Tombs north of the city.  This land became the zoo's off-site breeding center.

The zoo's development came to an abrupt halt with the onset of the Cultural Revolution in 1966 as zoo staff were purged, research work stopped, and contacts with foreign zoos were severed.  When Guo Moruo was denounced, the sign bearing his calligraphy was removed and replaced with one featuring characters pieced together from Chairman Mao's calligraphy.

In the 1970s, as China forged diplomatic relations with the Western bloc, the zoo received animal gifts from the Australia, France, Mexico, Nepal, Spain, Sri Lanka, the United Kingdom, and the United States. The zoo also organized a four-year mission to Ethiopia, Kenya, and Tanzania, which brought back 157 species and 1,000 animals including and aardvark, African elephant, baboon, giant tortoises, giraffe, Grant's gazelle, oryx, ostrich, Thomson's gazelle, wildebeest, and zebra.

During the 1984 Summer Olympics, the Beijing Zoo sent a pair of giant pandas, Yingxin and Yong Yong, to Los Angeles for an exhibition. In 1987, Yong Yong and Ling Ling went on exhibition at the Bronx Zoo.

Present
The buildings in the zoo cover an area of more than 50,000 square meters, including the elephant hall, the lion and tiger hall, the monkey hall, the panda hall, and many others. Altogether, there are more than 30 large halls.

The Beijing Zoo maintains an active breeding program that produced 1,104 surviving offspring of 92 species in 2013 including the critically endangered Northern white-cheeked gibbon and Guizhou snub-nosed monkey. Other reproduced species in 2013 include giant panda, golden takin, chimpanzee, De Brazza's monkey, Patas monkey, vervet monkey, mantled guereza, Bengal slow loris, tufted capuchin, Pere David's deer and hippopatamus.

Visitors to the zoo can also explore its many Qing dynasty buildings.

Beijing Aquarium
The Beijing Aquarium is located within the zoological park, on the northern bank of the Chang River.  Opened in 1999, the aquarium complex covers an area of 120,000 square meters, with 42,000 square meters of interior space. It is the biggest aquarium in China with a large number of fish species and marine mammals.  Visitors can watch shows performed by dolphins, belugas, and sea lions.

Location and access

The Beijing Zoo is located at 137 Xizhimen Wai Dajie in Xicheng District, just west of the northwest corner of the 2nd Ring Road.  Outside the zoo is a local public transit hub with Beijing Zoo Station on Line 4 of the Beijing Subway and terminals for Beijing Bus routes 7, 15, 19, 102, and 103.  Bus routes 27, 105, 107, 111, 305, 347, 360, 362, 534, 563, 604, 632, 686, 特4, 特19, 夜8 also stop at the zoo.

Nearby attractions
The Beijing Planetarium is located diagonally across the street from the zoo's main entrance.  To the west of the zoo is the Purple Bamboo Park.  To the east is the Beijing Exhibition Center and the Moscow Restaurant.

Controversies
According to a 2010 article in The Guardian, a restaurant located in the Beijing Zoo, named "Bin Feng Tan," offers various dishes of exotic animals on its menu.  The restaurant manager commented that its dishes were within the law, as the animal products were supplied by exotic animal farms.  However, the restaurant has received a backlash since the news spread. Ge Rui of the International Wildlife Fund describes the restaurant's menu and practices as "utterly inappropriate for a zoo" and "socially irresponsible."  Following the negative coverage, the restaurant stated they would be revising the menu.

In popular culture
A significant portion of James Rollins' Sigma Force novel, The Bone Labyrinth (2015), takes place in, near, and below the Beijing Zoo. Rollins depicts unsanitary and inhumane conditions at the zoo, and inhumane animal experimentation there.  In the "Author's Note to Readers: Truth or Fiction", Rollins writes: "I did visit the Beijing Zoo and found the state of that zoological park to be appalling. The government continues to hint at changes and plans to move the place into a larger poo outside the city with more modern accommodations. So hopefully now that I've blown it up, they'll get on with those plans."

Fish and Elephant, directed by documentary filmmaker and former TV hostess Li Yu, is based within the zoo. The film is often referred to as the first Chinese mainland film to broach the topic of lesbian relationships in China.

See also
 List of endangered and protected species of China

References

External links

  
 China Report - Beijing Zoo Update
 Brief Introduction
 Beijing Zoo on zooinstitutes.com
 (in Chinese) Website of the Chinese Association of Zoological Gardens Archived

Buildings and structures in Beijing
Major National Historical and Cultural Sites in Beijing
Parks in Beijing
Tourist attractions in Beijing
Xicheng District
Zoos established in 1906
Zoos in China
1906 establishments in China